José Guerrero may refer to:

Sports 
José Guerrero (tennis), Spanish tennis player
José Daniel Guerrero (born 1987), Mexican football (soccer) player
José Félix Guerrero (born 1975), Spanish footballer
José Paolo Guerrero (born 1984), Peruvian football (soccer) player
José Guerrero (referee)
José María Guerrero (footballer), Ecuadorian football (soccer) player

Others 
José María Guerrero de Arcos y Molina (1799–1853), President of Honduras and (later) Nicaragua
José Gustavo Guerrero (1876–1958), Salvadoran jurist, first president of the International Court of Justice
José Guerrero (artist) (1914–1991), Spanish painter in the United States